LoCash (stylized as LOCASH), formerly known as LoCash Cowboys, is an American country music duo consisting of vocalists Chris Lucas and Preston Brust. They have released 3 studio albums, one each for Average Joes Entertainment, Reviver Records, and Wheelhouse Records. The duo has charted 3 songs on the Billboard Hot Country Songs and 13 songs on the Country Airplay chart. Their highest-charting single is "I Know Somebody", which topped the Billboard Country Airplay chart in 2016. In addition to their own material, the members of LoCash co-wrote Keith Urban's number-one single "You Gonna Fly" and Tim McGraw's "Truck Yeah".

History
LoCash Cowboys was founded in 2008 in Nashville, Tennessee by Preston Brust and Chris Lucas, both of whom are vocalists and songwriters.

The duo first signed to R&J Records (formerly Stroudavarious Records), for which they released three singles. The first, "Here Comes Summer", debuted at No. 60 on Hot Country Songs for the week ending May 8, 2010. It was made into a music video which aired on CMT. The duo's second single, "Keep in Mind", made top 40 in early 2011; and followup "You Got Me" reached No. 52.

In 2012, the LoCash Cowboys released the single "C.O.U.N.T.R.Y." through Average Joes Entertainment. The song was originally intended to be the fourth single from their debut album, but was held back due to the closing of R&J Records. The video premiered July 31, 2012 on GAC. A dance remix of "C.O.U.N.T.R.Y." featuring Colt Ford was also released, and was included on the album Mud Digger, Vol. 3, also from Average Joes.

Brust and Lucas co-wrote Keith Urban's 2011 single "You Gonna Fly" and Tim McGraw's 2012 single "Truck Yeah".

By 2015, the duo had dropped "Cowboys" and released a new single as LoCash: "I Love This Life", via Reviver Records. It became their first Top 5 hit in late 2015. The EP album's second single, "I Know Somebody" released to country radio on February 22, 2016. It reached at number one on the Billboard charts in October 2016. The duo was nominated for the Academy of Country Music's New Duo or Group in 2017. "Ring on Every Finger", released in December 2016, is the third single from The Fighters. Thomas Rhett wrote the song, and had planned to include it on his second album Tangled Up.

In August 2018, LoCash signed a record deal with Broken Bow Records' Wheelhouse Records imprint. Their first release for the label is "Feels Like a Party", which the duo co-wrote with Tyler Hubbard of Florida Georgia Line. Wheelhouse released the corresponding album, Brothers, in March 2019.

Albums

Studio albums

Extended plays

Singles

Notes

Music videos

Awards and nominations

References

External links 

Official website

Country music groups from Tennessee
Country music duos
R&J Records artists
Average Joes Entertainment artists
Musical groups established in 2004
BBR Music Group artists